César Ramírez is the name of:
César Augusto Ramírez (born 1975), Paraguayan footballer
César Ramírez (tennis) "el Tiburón" (born 1990), Mexican tennis player
César Ramírez (actor) (1929–2003), Filipino actor
César Ramírez (athlete), Mexican athlete